Matilda Lucas-Rodd (born 18 April 1996) is an Australian rules footballer playing for the Hawthorn Football Club in the AFL Women's (AFLW). She previously played for the Carlton Football Club from 2017 to 2019 and the St Kilda Football Club from 2020 to 2022. She was the inaugural Hawthorn best and fairest winner, and has served as Hawthorn captain since season seven.

AFL Women's career

Carlton (2017–2019)
Lucas-Rodd was drafted by Carlton with the 99th overall selection in the 2016 AFL Women's draft, making her debut in Round 1, 2017, in the league's inaugural match at Ikon Park against Collingwood. In round 5 she earned a nomination for the 2017 AFLW Rising Star award following her match against Fremantle. Lucas-Rodd finished 2017 having played in all seven of Carlton's matches that season. In April 2019, Lucas-Rodd was delisted by Carlton.

St Kilda (2020–2022)
Lucas-Rodd was recruited by St Kilda as a delisted free agent and helped lead their maiden season in the VFLW, finishing 2nd on the ladder and making the preliminary final before succumbing to eventual premiers Collingwood. Her season was capped off by winning the club's best and fairest award, as well as receiving a place in the VFLW Team of the Year. It was revealed Lucas-Rodd had signed on with the Saints for two more years on 30 June 2021, tying her to the club until the end of the 2022/2023 season.

Statistics
Updated to the end of S7 (2022).

|-
| 2017 ||  || 18
| 7 || 0 || 1 || 49 || 24 || 73 || 10 || 18 || 0.0 || 0.1 || 7.0 || 3.4 || 10.4 || 1.4 || 2.6 || 0
|-
| 2018 ||  || 18
| 6 || 0 || 1 || 34 || 16 || 50 || 9 || 21 || 0.0 || 0.2 || 5.7 || 2.7 || 8.3 || 1.5 || 3.5 || 0
|-
| 2019 ||  || 18
| 5 || 2 || 1 || 20 || 13 || 33 || 4 || 16 || 0.4 || 0.2 || 4.0 || 2.6 || 6.6 || 0.8 || 3.2 || 0
|-
| 2020 ||  || 18
| 6 || 0 || 0 || 55 || 24 || 79 || 14 || 14 || 0.0 || 0.0 || 9.2 || 4.0 || 13.2 || 2.3 || 2.3 || 1
|-
| 2021 ||  || 18
| 9 || 0 || 0 || 99 || 34 || 133 || 21 || 26 || 0.0 || 0.0 || 11.0 || 3.8 || 14.8 || 2.3 || 2.9 || 1
|-
| 2022 ||  || 18
| 10 || 1 || 2 || 134 || 67 || 201 || 19 || 70 || 0.1 || 0.2 || 13.4 || 6.7 || 20.1 || 1.9 || 7.0 || 11
|-
| S7 (2022) ||  || 18
| 10 || 3 || 1 || 118 || 58 || 176 || 15 || 84 || 0.3 || 0.1 || 11.8 || 5.8 || 17.6 || 1.5 || 8.4 || 6
|- class=sortbottom
! colspan=3 | Career
! 53 !! 6 !! 6 !! 509 !! 236 !! 745 !! 92 !! 249 !! 0.1 !! 0.1 !! 9.6 !! 4.5 !! 14.1 !! 1.7 !! 4.7 !! 19
|}

Honours and achievements
 Hawthorn captain: S7 (2022)–present
 Hawthorn equal games record holder
 Hawthorn best and fairest: S7
 AFL Women's Rising Star nominee: 2017

References

External links

 
 
 

Living people
1996 births
Carlton Football Club (AFLW) players
Australian rules footballers from Victoria (Australia)
Sportswomen from Victoria (Australia)
Victorian Women's Football League players
St Kilda Football Club (AFLW) players
Lesbian sportswomen
LGBT players of Australian rules football
Australian LGBT sportspeople
Hawthorn Football Club (AFLW) players